The 2008–09 West Virginia Mountaineers men's basketball team represents West Virginia University in the 2008-09 NCAA Division I men's basketball season. The team is coached by Bob Huggins and plays their home games in the WVU Coliseum in Morgantown, West Virginia.

Pre-season
During the offseason, the Mountaineers picked up four recruits who look to make an immediate impact in Morgantown. Devin Ebanks a 6–9, 205 pound forward from Oakdale, CT seems to be the Mountaineers #1 recruit, being ranked #11 on the Rivals.com Top 150 recruits. The Mountaineers also added Darryl "Truck" Bryant, a 6-2 190 pound guard from Brooklyn, NY, Kevin Jones, a 6-7 210 pound forward from Mount Vernon, NY, and Dee Proby a 6-9 250 pound forward from Angelina College in Lufkin, TX. West Virginia was picked to finish 9th in the Big East Pre-Season Coaches Poll.

Roster

Schedule and results

|-
!colspan=12 style=|Regular Season

|-
!colspan=12 style=|Big East tournament 

|-
!colspan=12 style=|NCAA Tournament

Rankings

References

West, Virginia
West Virginia Mountaineers men's basketball seasons
West Virginia
Mount
Mount